Weird Travels is an American documentary paranormal television series that originally aired from 2001 to 2006 on the Travel Channel. Produced by Authentic Entertainment, the program features various paranormal subjects around the world, especially monsters and purportedly haunted locations around the world. The series is narrated by Don Wildman, who also hosts and narrates History's documentary television series Cities of the Underworld and Travel Channel's Off Limits.

Synopsis
Weird Travels purpose is to investigate and uncover some of the biggest mysteries in the world. The series features anything from paranormal-related to things out of the ordinary by traveling the globe to discover the truth on these subjects. Each episode consists of a certain theme: such as creepy creatures like the Loch Ness Monster and Bigfoot, exploring mysterious civilizations like the Maya and the Nazca, and searching for clues in the age old legend of the Holy Grail to the present phenomena of crop circles and UFOs.

Series overview

Episodes

See also
 Cryptozoology
 Cryptid
 Paranormal television

References

External links

Travel Channel original programming
Cryptozoological television series
2000s American documentary television series
2001 American television series debuts
2006 American television series endings
Television series by Authentic Entertainment